Lemuel McPherson Christian MBE (1913–2000) was a Dominican music educator and composer, who wrote the music for "Isle of Beauty, Isle of Splendour", the national anthem of the Commonwealth of Dominica, the words being written by Wilfred Oscar Morgan Pond (1912–1985). Also a music teacher, Christian ran the first music school in the Eastern Caribbean.

Biography

L. M. Christian was born on the island of Saint Kitts, where his father William Matthew Christian (1879–1961) was serving as a police sergeant in the Leeward Islands Police Force, and came to Dominica as a child.

Following in the footsteps of his father, a skilled guitarist who in the 1930s founded a family orchestra, L. M. Christian in 1944 opened the Christian Musical Class and Commercial School, the first music school in the Eastern Caribbean.

He was made a Member of the Most Excellent Order of the British Empire (MBE) in the 1966 Queen's Birthday Honours for services to music education in Dominica.

Alongside lyrics by Wilfred Oscar Morgan Pond (1912–1985), Christian's music for "Isle of Beauty, Isle of Splendour" was adopted as the national anthem in 1967 when Dominica achieved statehood status within the British Commonwealth and was retained upon the country's independence in 1978. It listed by The Guardian as one of the 10 best national anthems of countries competing at the 2008 Beijing Olympics.

Christian was inducted into the Hall of Fame of St Luke’s Primary School.

Family life

Christian passed on his love of music to his children, all of whom are professional musicians including his daughters Peganini, Palestrina, and Verdi, and his sons Handel and Purcell. In 2013, Purcell received a Golden Drum Award, Dominica's highest cultural award, "for giving praise-worthy service work in music education and performance". 

L. M. Christian's siblings included Wendell McKenzie Christian (1921–2011, father of Gabriel J. Christian) and Henckell Lockinvar Christian, who was the father of music educator and composer Pearle Christian and served in as Minister of Education and Health in the Dominica government.

References

1913 births
2000 deaths
Dominica musicians
20th-century composers
Members of the Order of the British Empire
Immigrants to Dominica